Jason Alan White (born June 5, 1979) is an American professional stock car racing driver. He competes part-time in the NASCAR Craftsman Truck Series, driving the No. 1 Toyota Tundra for TRICON Garage.

Racing career

Early career
White began racing go-karts when he was eleven, and has been racing part-time since. Before moving to Busch Series, White dominated the Virginia go-kart circuit. In a five-year stretch, Jason won six Virginia state titles and finished in the World Karting Association top-ten for three different classes of vehicles.

Xfinity Series
White made his first starts in 1999, running the No. 28 for Larry Lockamy. He started 28th and finished 26th in a solid debut at IRP. He was then 43rd after an early crash at Bristol.

The runs earned him a spot on Felix Sabates' Chip Ganassi Racing No. 82 Chevrolet in a fill-in role in 2000. He ran the Channellock Chevrolet at South Boston, putting in his career best of 21st position. Then, he was 28th at Myrtle Beach.

White next returned in 2002, running a race at Nashville for Frank Cicci Racing. He finished 43rd at Nashville after an early engine problem. Fred Bickford then picked White up for three races, beginning with a 28th-place finish at New Hampshire. His best run came at Nazareth, where he finished 22nd before adding a 37th at Charlotte.

White's busiest year was 2003, when he earned 29th in points after a splitting rides at Davis Motorsports and Jay Robinson Racing. He ran mainly for JRR early in the year, finishing a best of 23rd at Gateway. Beginning at Nashville in June, White took over the No. 0 Davis Motorsports Chevrolet full-time. He ran solidly in that race, earning his best career finish of 17th. He would record one other top-20 finish at Pikes Peak, trying to do his best with the low-budget team. White was released following the Memphis race in favor of Kertus Davis.

White returned to the series in four races in 2004, all for MacDonald Motorsports. After a pair of 33rds and a 42nd at Richmond, White earned his best run of the year at Milwaukee, finishing 29th. It was also the site of his best qualifying effort of the year: 28th.

In 2006, White teamed up with the new Ashton Gray Racing, sponsored by GunBroker.com. Despite being fast in practice, the team broke before qualifying in the spring Nashville race, meaning the team's debut would come at Nashville in June. He was 36th in that race and 30th at Milwaukee. Then at Gateway Jason finished 41st due to engine problems. Next race is the Emerson Radio 250 at Richmond International Raceway. He also made one start in the series in 2007.

White returned to the Nationwide Series in 2013, driving for SR² Motorsports. In May, White recorded his best career Nationwide finish, finished 8th in the Aaron's 312, at Talladega.

After being without a ride for seven years, White returned to NASCAR in 2021, driving RSS Racing/Reaume Brothers Racing No. 23 in the Xfinity Series season-opener at Daytona. He then drove the No. 13 for MBM Motorsports in the spring race at Talladega.
White also raced at Talladega for MBM at the fall Talladega race but crashed in the final restart.

Craftsman Truck Series
White made his first few starts in the Craftsman Truck Series in 2001, racing in seven events. He ran the No. 86 NWTF Ford in six races. His first career start came at Mesa Marin, where he had an impressive sixteenth-place run. He then followed that up with a 13th-place run at Martinsville, which would end up being his best career finish. He had one other top-20 for the team: an 18th at Pikes Peak. Later in the year, White made a one-race start for Troxell Racing. His run in Kansas resulted in a 36th-place finish, the last place truck.

White only made two starts in 2002. First, he ran the No. 0 Loni Richardson-owned Chevrolet at Texas, finishing 22nd. Then, he joined the Ware Racing Enterprises team at Kentucky. However, he only managed 34th after electrical problems.

White would make two more starts in 2003, running 30th at Dover (running the No. 35 Ford) and 35th at Kansas (running the No. 93 Troxell Racing vehicle). He did not finish either event and would turn to the Busch Series for his attention, as he had not raced in the series since.

In 2007, White was scheduled to run two races with MB Motorsports along with sponsor GunBroker.com, but resulted in a one-race deal at Daytona. In April, it was announced that White would run the rest of 2007 season in the No. 7 for Pennington Motorsports with sponsorship from Hooters Energy Drink. For 2008, White joined SS-Green Light Racing and brought along GunBroker.com as a sponsor and had a fair, but uneventful season, which placed him in a Toyota for one race. In 2009, White signed up with GunBroker Racing to drive a full-season in the No. 23 GunBroker.com Dodge Ram. White scored his season best finish at Kansas in May, placing in the top 10. White also led 86 laps at the O'Reilly 200 at Bristol Motor Speedway but finished 14th after a late pit stop. In September, White had his career best qualifying effort and career best finish of 3rd at Las Vegas Motor Speedway. For 2010, White and GunBroker moved to SS-Green Light Racing, where they started off the season on a high note by winning the pole for the NextEra Energy Resources 250 at Daytona International Speedway. White had his best season to date, grabbing 3 top fives and 7 top 10s en route to finishing 10th in points. White and GunBroker.com left SS-Green Light Racing at season's end and moved to the upstart Joe Denette Motorsports. However, White and JDM struggled to a 15th-place finish in points, and White and GunBroker left to form their own team for 2012.

Cup Series

On August 7, 2011, White made his debut in the NASCAR Sprint Cup Series at Pocono Raceway, driving the No. 32 for FAS Lane Racing. He returned to drive for the team in the Sprint Cup Series race at Pocono a year later, replacing John Wes Townley.

Motorsports career results

NASCAR
(key) (Bold – Pole position awarded by qualifying time. Italics – Pole position earned by points standings or practice time. * – Most laps led.)

Sprint Cup Series

Xfinity Series

Craftsman Truck Series

 Season still in progress
 Ineligible for series points

References

External links
  
 

Living people
1979 births
Sportspeople from Richmond, Virginia
Racing drivers from Virginia
NASCAR drivers
World Karting Association drivers